Zhang Qilong (1900 – June 3, 1987) was a People's Republic of China politician. He was born in Liuyang, Hunan Province. He joined the Chinese Communist Party in 1926 and participated in the Autumn Harvest Uprising of 1927. He was a member of the Chinese Workers' and Peasants' Red Army during the Chinese Civil War, the Eighth Route Army and the People's Liberation Army. In 1933, his party membership was revoked and he divorced his then wife, Li Zhen, to avoid implicating her in his disgrace. He was allowed back into the party in 1936. After the creation of the People's Republic of China, he was the first party chief for Heilongjiang Province.

References

宋任穷. 悼张启龙同志. 人民网，来源：1987年7月15日《人民日报》第4版. [2012-09-28] 
李贞将军三次婚姻的酸甜苦辣. 河北新闻网，来源：书刊报. 2011-04-22 [2012-09-28]
张光彩. 铁骨英风：张启龙传奇人生. 中共党史出版社. 2012年1月. 

1900 births
1987 deaths
People's Republic of China politicians from Hunan
Chinese Communist Party politicians from Hunan
CCP committee secretaries of Heilongjiang
Politicians from Changsha